Deizy Nhaquile (born 30 July 2000) is a Mozambican sailor. She competed in the Laser Radial event at the 2020 Summer Olympics.

References

External links
 
 

2000 births
Living people
Mozambican female sailors (sport)
Olympic sailors of Mozambique
Sailors at the 2020 Summer Olympics – Laser Radial
Place of birth missing (living people)